Opiná is a village and municipality in Košice-okolie District in the Kosice Region of eastern Slovakia.

History
In historical records the village was first mentioned in 1418.

Geography
The village lies at an altitude of 367 metres and covers an area of 11.953 km².
It has a population of about 180 people.

Ethnicity
The population is entirely Slovak in ethnicity.

Culture
The village has a small public library and a general store.

External links

Villages and municipalities in Košice-okolie District
Šariš